Estadio Chamartín was a multi-use stadium in Madrid, Spain. It was initially used as the stadium of Real Madrid matches before the Santiago Bernabéu Stadium opened in 1947. The stadium held 22,500 people and was built in 1924. 

The stadium was inaugurated on 17 May 1924, with a 3–2 victory for Real Madrid against Newcastle United.

Closing and demolition
The final official match at the stadium was played on 13 May 1946, with Real Madrid winning 2–0 against CD Alcoyano in the quarter-finals of the Spanish Cup. Three days later, Real Madrid played the "closing" friendly against Málaga in which the visitors prevailed 5–4. Demolition works proceeded the day after.

References

External links
- Estadios Espana 

Defunct football venues in Spain
Chamartín
Former sports venues in Madrid
Sports venues completed in 1924
Sports venues demolished in 1946
1924 establishments in Spain
1946 disestablishments in Spain